TiEmu is an emulator that works on many different operating systems like Linux/Unix, macOS, FreeBSD, Microsoft Windows and so on. It emulates the Motorola 68000 series Texas Instruments graphing calculators (TI-89, TI-89 Titanium, TI-92, TI-92 Plus and Voyage 200). TiEmu is licensed under the GPL.

Various Parts of TiEmu
TiEmu 3 has many features:
 The emulator — this is the core of TiEmu 3.
 GDB integration — this is the main new feature of TiEmu 3. It allows calculator software programmers to debug their software with ease.
 tilibs framework — this is the framework that is used to link TiEmu 3 to either a calculator via Link Cable, TiLP, another TiEmu instance or VTI. This feature can be used for the use of programming/debugging software for the calculator that requires a link to another calculator unit.

Development of TiEmu

With the development of tilibs2 and improvements made to TiEmu code, TiEmu 3 is quite stable.
 TiEmu 3 — While development of some new features is finished, improvements such as bug fixes still need to be made.
 tilibs2 — The latest official snapshot version of TiEmu 3 implements tilibs versions:
 libticables2 — 1.3.0
 libticalcs2 — 1.1.3
 libticonv — 1.1.0
 libtifiles2 — 1.1.2

TiEmu Team
The TiEmu team currently consists of these team members:
 Romain Liévin — The TiEmu/TiLP Team Leader.
 Julien Blache — former Debian packager, infrastructure provider.
 Lionel Debroux — from the TI-Chess Team (TICT) and GCC4TI.

External links
 (official website) lpg.ticalc.org/prj_tiemu a m68k based TI Graphing Calculator Emulator.
 lpg.ticalc.org/prj_tilp TiLP is an alternative calculator-to-computer linking software to TI-Connect.
 tigcc.ticalc.org The official TIGCC website: TiEmu is the emulator of choice for TIGCC.
 trac.godzil.net/gcc4ti The official GCC4TI website: TiEmu is the emulator of choice for GCC4TI.
 education.ti.com The official Texas Instruments website for their graphing calculators.

Graphing calculator software
Texas Instruments calculators
Free emulation software